Koninklijke Atletiek Associatie Gent (English: Royal Athletic Association Ghent), often simply known as Ghent or by their nickname , is a Belgian sports club, based in the city of Ghent, East Flanders. Their football team is the best known section within the club and has been playing in the Belgian First Division A since the 1989–90 season. They won the national league once, in 2014–15, in addition to four Belgian Cup victories. Ghent played their home matches in the Jules Ottenstadion in Gentbrugge from 1920 until 2013, when they moved to the Ghelamco Arena. Their team colours are blue and white. The principal sponsor is the financial institution VDK bank.

The field hockey and track and field divisions were founded in 1864, making it one of the oldest sports clubs in Belgium. The club was then known under its French name La Gantoise (and it is still referred to as such in the French-speaking part of Belgium). They changed their name to the current Dutch version in 1971. The football division opened in 1900.

Gent enjoyed its first spell at the highest level in Belgian football between 1913–14 and 1928–29, and a second one from 1936–37 to 1966–67. In the 1970s and 1980s, the club had several promotions and relegations between the first and second divisions, before returning to the highest level in 1989. The club reached the quarter-finals of the 1991–92 UEFA Cup, which is their best achievement ever in European competitions.

Aside from football, Gent also have other sports sections in track and field and field hockey.

History
In 1864, an association called the 'Société Gymnastique la Gantoise', which was tasked with promoting gymnastics, was founded. Some branches quickly became independent and in 1891 the team merged with the Association Athlétique, which was in itself a merger of younger teams, such as Racing Club, Running Club and Red Star. The new merger team was called Association Athlétique La Gantoise, and aside from gymnastics, the activities were broadened to athletics, boxing, cricket, cycling, fencing, hockey, swimming and tennis. In this context, the athletics team KAA Gent was founded.

In the last decade of the 19th century, organized football was introduced in Ghent. Different small teams were founded and some merged into Racing Club Gantois on 1 April 1899, which would later become the biggest challenger of KAA Gent. Only in 1900, a football section was founded by the students of the College of Melle, which is a place close to Ghent. The first president of the team was doctor Hector Priem. The games were played on the Carpentierplein, which was situated at the crossroads of the Kortrijksesteenweg, the Clementinalaan, the Oostendestraat and the Astridlaan. Initially, the colours black and white were chosen, but by 31 October 1900, when the team became an official member, the colours were changed to blue and white. On 15 November 1900, the first regular game was played, against Omnium Sporting Club. In January 1901, the team played against Racing Club Gantois, which was, at that time, the larger of the two. KAA Gent lost the game with 10–0. Nevertheless, at the end of the 19th century the team already became a member of the UBSSA (Union Belge des Sociétés de Sports Athlétiques or the Belgian Union of the Athletic Sports Society, and although Racing Club Gantois was the elder team in the city, KAA Gent would receive a lower  matricule number than Racing Club, which would receive 11. In 1901 AA La Gantoise played its first games in the lower divisions.

For the first few years, the team mostly played in the Belgian Second Division, and later on in the First Division. In 1904 the team moved to the Mussenstraat. In 1913, the World Exposition was held at that place, and the team moved once more, this time to the Albertlaan. Over there, a football pitch, training fields, tennis courts, an athletics court, galleries and other accommodations were being built. At 9 December 1915, during the First World War, the stadium completely burned down. In 1912–13, AA La Gantoise became champion in the Second Division. In 1914, the team received the royal title and was called Association Royale Athlétique La Gantoise, which was abbreviated to ARA La Gantoise. During the world exposition, the team organized several sporting events. The first season in the First League, 1913–14, was nevertheless very difficult for the team and only by means of a test match against Standard Club Liégois, relegation was avoided.

In 1920, the team moved again, this time to Gentbrugge, where the Jules Ottenstadion was built. La Gantoise fell back to the Second Division and it was not until 1936 it managed to win the promotion play-offs and return to the First Division. In the mid-fifties, the team played their strongest football yet. In 1953–54 it ended third with an equal total of points as KFC Malinois and only one point behind the champions Anderlecht. The next season, La Gantoise was alone on the second spot, this time with three points less than the champions. In 1964 it won the Belgian Cup (Beker van België), which was the first major tournament victory for the team. Because of their cup win, it became the first Belgian team to participate in the European Cup Winners' Cup. La Gantoise was defeated in the first round by West Ham United. In 1967, the club relegated once more, after three decades of playing in the First Division. It did, however, only take them one year to clinch promotion again.

In 1971, the name of the team was translated into Flemish, as it became "Koninklijke Atletiek Associatie Gent" (commonly known as KAA Gent or AA Gent). The 1970–71 season was the start of a bad decade for Ghent. They were relegated to the Second Division six games before the season's ending, after the defeat to Club Brugge. In 1974, they even relegated to the Third Division. Ghent had ended last and couldn't assure its promotion to the Second Division in the final round. After one season, they would return to the Second Division and remained there until 1980, when the team returned to the First Division. The 1980s would become a much better period for the team. In 1984 they won the Belgian Cup again, and during that period the team played in European competitions four times. In 1986–87, Ghent reached the Third round in the UEFA Cup. In 1988 the team fell back to the Second Division for a short while, but thanks to the promotion play-offs, they were able to return to First Division after one season. A crucial role was played by a member of the Board of Directors, Marc Mortier, who consulted the Prime Minister of Belgium, Wilfried Martens, in order to establish an organisation named Foot Invest, to get the team financially back on track. Marc Mortier gathered more than 50 million Belgian francs (1.25 million euros) in sponsoring in a couple of months and introduced VDK Spaarbank as the main sponsor of the team.

In 1990–91, the team played at the top of the standings for a long time, under the guidance of René Vandereycken and players such as Frank Dauwen, Eric Viscaal and Erwin Vandenbergh, but finally it ended on the third spot. So instead of competing in the UEFA Champions League, the team played in the UEFA Cup in 1991. After defeating Lausanne-Sport, Eintracht Frankfurt and Dynamo Moscow, Ghent played the quarter finals against Ajax. The following years, Ghent fell back to the lower places in the standings. From 1994 until 1997, they finished just above the relegation places in the league. By the end of the 1990s the results improved again, and with coach Trond Sollied, KAA Gent qualified for European football once more in 1999–00. In these series, Ghent lost heavily against Ajax, under new coach Henk Houwaart. The next season, Ghent reached the UEFA Intertoto Cup, where it would reach the semi-finals against PSG. The following seasons, league results varied between lower sub-top places and top four finishes.

In 2004, Ghent signed coach Georges Leekens. In his first season, the team ended at the sixth spot in competition. With Leekens as a coach, KAA Gent made some impressive performances, such as the 4–1 victory over rival Club Brugge on 1 April 2006. In 2006–07, despite a weak start of the competition, the team managed to reach the fourth place in the Belgian Pro League. It repeated that achievement the following year.

The next season, coach Georges Leekens left the club and joined Lokeren. Trond Sollied, the Norwegian trainer who had been very successful seven years before, succeeded him. Under his guidance, KAA Gent played its third Cup Final, in which it only lost at the end from Anderlecht. Sollied left Ghent again after one season, this time for Heerenveen. Michel Preud'homme, who had just become champion of the Jupiler Pro League with Standard Liège, signed a contract for three seasons, together with his colleagues Manu Ferrera and Stan van den Buys. In 2008–09, the team ended at the fourth spot, after a strong comeback in the second part of the competition, with an equal number of points as Club Brugge, who had won one more game and ended third.

In 2009–10, there was a heavy battle for the second place in the Belgian Pro League between AA Gent and Club Brugge and the Champions League ticket that came with it. They played each other on 8 May 2010. Ghent won with a convincing 6–2 score and won second place because of that victory. One week later, Ghent also won the Belgian Cup for the first time in 26 years, defeating the other Bruges Pro League team, Cercle Brugge.

On 17 July 2013, the club officially inaugurated their new stadium, the Ghelamco Arena, with a 2–0 win over VfB Stuttgart in a gala match.

On 21 May 2015, Ghent clinched their first Belgium League title by defeating Standard Liège 2–0 at home, automatically qualifying for the group stage of the UEFA Champions League. Gent were drawn in Group H, against Russian champions Zenit Saint Petersburg, the Spanish team Valencia and the French Lyon. The Belgian champions were able to perform better than expected. On matchday 1, Ghent draw 1–1 with Olympique Lyon at Ghelamco Arena, securing their first point in Champions League group stages, after Milićević scored to bring the score to a tie, conceding Jallet's goal. In matchday 2, they were beaten by Zenit 1–2 at Petrovsky Stadium, Saint Petersburg, Russia; they were led 0–1 with a goal by Dzyuba and managed to bring the score to a 1–1 tie with a goal by Matton, but Russian international Shatov scored for Ghent's first Champions League group stage defeat. On matchday 3, they lost again 1–2 against Valencia on Mestalla, Valencia, Spain; they hold Valencia in a 1–1 tie before the half break, but Mitrović's own goal in the 71st minute put an end to their hopes for a draw. On matchday 4, at Ghelamco Arena, Gent beat Valencia 1–0, after Kums successfully converted a penalty kick in the 49th minute to obtain their historical first Champions League victory. On matchday 5, at Stade de Gerland, Lyon, France, Ghent beat Lyon 2–1; Ferri's 0–1 goal was conceded when Milićević brought the score to a tie, only for substitute Coulibaly to score the most dramatic goal of winners with the last touch of the match, in the 95th minute as Gent earned qualification in either Champions League or Europa League knockout phases. In order to qualify for the Champions League knock-out phases, Gent needed a victory against group leaders Zenit, as it could qualify even if Valencia would win at Lyon thanks to their away goal. On marchday 6, Gent won 2–1 against Zenit, finishing the group on second place and becoming only the second Belgian team to advance to the Champions League knockout phase, as Lyon beat Valencia, after Anderlecht in 2000–01. In the round of 16, they were drawn against Wolfsburg. In the first leg at Ghelamco Stadium, Ghent, Belgium, Gent were defeated 2–3 by Wolfsburg, after being led with 0–3 and managing to score two goals in the last ten minutes. The second game, this time in Wolfsburg, ended 1–0, setting an end to Ghent's European tournament. However, It was the best european season for them. In the 2016/17 season, they played Europe League. They faced Tottenham, first winning at home in the Ghelamco Arena and then drawing in Wembley, thus advancing on aggregate. Around 8000 KAA Gent fans attended the match in the away-end, after they were awarded an extra 1000 tickets for their excellent reputation. In the next round they faced fellow Belgian side KRC Genk, this time on the losing end. That set an end for their 2nd best european season.

Rivalries 
KAA Gent have a fierce rivalry with Club Brugge, in what is dubbed as the "Battle of Flanders" in the media as it is between Flanders' two cultural capitals (Antwerp having been historically a part of the Duchy of Brabant). There are also many Club Brugge supporters in the city of Ghent due to internal migration from West Flanders to the city, while KAA Gent pride themselves on their local identity. The nickname that KAA Gent fans give to the Club Brugge fans is the Flemish word "boeren" ("peasants"), mainly because of the agricultural background of West-Flanders but also because of the insolence that Club Brugge fans have displayed in the past.

Honours
Belgian First Division:
Winner (1): 2014–15
Runner-up (3): 1954–55, 2009–10, 2019–20
Belgian Cup:
Winner (4): 1963–64, 1983–84, 2009–10, 2021–22
Runner-up (2): 2007–08, 2018–19
Belgian Super Cup:
Winners (1): 2015
Runner-up (2): 1983–84, 2010
UEFA Intertoto Cup:
Runner-up (2): 2006, 2007

European record
Accurate as of 18 August 2022

Legend: GF = Goals For. GA = Goals Against. GD = Goal Difference.

Matches 

Notes
 1R: First round
 2R: Second round
 3R: Third round
 QR: Qualifying round
 2Q: Second qualifying round
 3Q: Third qualifying round
 PO: Play-off round
 KPO: Knockout round play-offs
 R32: Round of 32
 R16: Round of 16
 QF: Quarter-finals

Players

Current squad

Other players under contract

Out on loan

Technical staff & management

Well-known former players of the team

Four players of AA Gent held top scorer positions in the UEFA: Maurice Willems (1956–57, 28 games, 35 goals), Ronny Martens (1984–85, 34 games, 23 goals), Erwin Vandenbergh (1990–91, 34 games, 23 goals) and Ole Martin Arst (1999–00, 33 games, 30 goals).

The Belgian player Roland Storme, central defender of KAA Gent in 1958–59, received the Golden Shoe award. Three other AA Gent players were presented with awards and honors: René Vandereycken got the award for trainer of the year 1991. Frédéric Herpoel was chosen as the best goalkeeper in 2004.

Mbark Boussoufa received multiple awards and honors including: pro-player of the year, best young player and the award of the 12th man, as well as the Ebony Shoe. Another AA Gent player, the Egyptian Ahmed "Mido" Hossam was also presented with the Ebony Shoe 8 years earlier in 2001.

Maurice Willems has scored more goals than any other KAA Gent player, with 185 goals between 1952 and 1962.

Armand Seghers holds the record of the most games played in the first team of KAA Gent: 507 between 1949 and 1960.

Marc Van Der Linden was in the national selection of Belgium for the 1990 World Cup in Italy.

Richard Orlans holds the most selections for the Belgium National Team, more than any other KAA Gent player. He was selected 21 times from 1955 – 1958.

Frédéric Herpoel was four times honoured with the Jean-Claude Bouvy Trophy for "most valuable player of the season" between 2002 – 2005.

Tore André Dahlum was a Norwegian international who played one year in Ghent.

Kevin De Bruyne is a Belgium international and Manchester City player who spent six years at Gent during his youth career.

Congolese player Leon Mokuna was the first African player in Belgian competition, in 1957. Compatriot Pierre Mwana Kasongo would join the club in 1965 and Kiyika Tokodi would do so in 1980.

Jean-Claude Bouvy Trophy
The Jean-Claude Bouvy Trophy is an award that is annually handed out to the most valuable player of Belgian football club K.A.A. Gent. It was established in 1979 and later named after Jean-Claude Bouvy, a player of Gent who died in a car crash in 1986.

Winners

Coaching history

 Hector Priem (1901–09)
 Van Steenkiste (1909–10)
 Horta (1910–12)
 Bunyan (1912–22)
 De Rijke (1922–31)
 Staff Pelsmaecker (1931–41)
 Hugi Fenichel (1941–42)
 Willibald Stejskal (1942–43)
 Fons Ferchyér (1943–45)
 Edmond Delfour (1945–51)
 Karl Mütsch (1951–52)
 Jules Vandooren (1952–56)
 Edmond Delfour (1956–59)
 Jacques Favre (1959–60)
 Louis Verstraeten (1960–64)
 Max Schirschin (1964–65)
 Julien Labeau (1965–66)
 Jules Bigot (1966–67)
 Jules Vandooren (1967–71)
 István Sztani (1971–73)
 Omer Van Boxelaer (1973–74)
 Richard Orlans (1974–76)
 Freddy Qvick (1976)
 Roland Storme (1976 –77)
 Norberto Höfling (1977–78)
 Léon Nollet (1978 – September 80)
 Han Grijzenhout (1980–81)
 Robert Goethals (1981 – January 83)
 Erwin Vanden Daele (1983 – November 83)
 Han Grijzenhout (1984 – December 86)
 Gérard Bergholtz (1987)
 Ab Fafié (1987 – April 88)
 Erwin Vandendaele (1988–89)

 Hans Dorjee (1993)
 Walter Meeuws (1 July 1993 – 30 June 1994)
 Lei Clijsters (1994–96)
 Johan Boskamp (30 November 1996 – 30 September 1998)
 Herman Vermeulen (interim) (1998 – December 98)
 Trond Sollied (1 January 1999 – 30 June 2000)
 Henk Houwaart (1 July 2000 – 30 September 2000)
 Patrick Rémy (1 July 2000 – 30 June 2002)
 Herman Vermeulen (interim) (2001–02)
 Jan Olde Riekerink (1 July 2002 – 3 November 2003)

 Georges Leekens (18 May 2004 – 30 June 2007)
 Trond Sollied (1 July 2007 – 30 June 2008)
 Michel Preud'homme (1 July 2008 – 30 June 2010)
 Francky Dury (1 July 2010 – 30 June 2011)
 Trond Sollied (1 July 2011 – 23 October 2012)
 Manu Ferrera (interim) (23 October 2012 – 1 November 2012)
 Bob Peeters (1 November 2012 – 3 January 2013)
 Manu Ferrera (interim) (January 2013)
 Víctor Fernández (9 January 2013 – 30 September 2013)
 Mircea Rednic (1 October 2013 – 9 April 2014)

 Hein Vanhaezebrouck (2014 – 27 September 2017)
 Yves Vanderhaeghe (October 2017 – 9 October 2018)
 Jess Thorup (10 October 2018 – 20 August 2020)
 László Bölöni (20 August 2020 - 14 September 2020)
 Wim De Decker (14 September 2020 – 4 December 2020)
 Hein Vanhaezebrouck (4 December 2020)

Presidents

References

External links

  
 KAA Gent at UEFA.COM
 KAA Gent at EUFO.DE 
 KAA Gent at Weltfussball.de 
 KAA Gent at Football Squads.com
 KAA Gent at National Football Teams.com
 KAA Gent at Football-Lineups.com

 
Association football clubs established in 1900
Multi-sport clubs in Belgium
Football clubs in Belgium
1864 establishments in Belgium
Sport in Ghent
Organisations based in Belgium with royal patronage
Belgian Pro League clubs